Edward Francis Burney (1760–1848) was an English artist. His middle name is sometimes given as "Francisco" or "Francesco".

Life
Burney was born in Worcester on 7 September 1760, the son of Richard Burney and Elizabeth Humphries. The musicologist Charles Burney was his uncle and the writer  Frances (or "Fanny") Burney was his cousin. He  studied at the Royal Academy Schools from 1776, where he received encouragement from  Sir Joshua Reynolds.

He exhibited at the Royal Academy from 1780 until 1803. His work included historical subjects and portraits of friends and family. A portrait of his cousin Frances was engraved as a frontispiece to her works, and in 1780 he exhibited three drawings illustrating  her novel Evelina, which were engraved for a 1791 edition of the work. Much of his work was done for book illustrations, including a series for an edition of Milton's Paradise Lost.

Satirical works
In the 1820s Burney painted four large watercolours satirising contemporary musical and social life: The Waltz, The Elegant Establishment for Young Ladies (both Victoria and Albert Museum), Amateurs of Tye-Wig Music  and The Glee Club; or, The Triumph of Music (both Yale Center for British Art), possibly with the intention of publishing prints after them. They were never engraved, but he did work up Amateurs of Tye-Wig Music  into an oil painting, now in the collection of the Tate Gallery. The picture draws on  the debate over the relative virtues of  modern music (exemplified by Beethoven and Mozart) as against that of  earlier composers, such as Handel, whose bust overlooks the  ramshackle band of  musicians  in the painting, and Corelli, one of whose pieces they are playing. Burney's uncle Charles took a leading part in the argument, on the side of the modernists.

Death
Burney died in London on 16 December 1848, at the age of 88. He never married.

References

Sources

External links
 Burney Centre at McGill University
 
  An engraving by William Thomas Fry of a painting by Burney in Forget Me Not, 1824, with a poetical illustration by Letitia Elizabeth Landon.

1760 births
1848 deaths
Artists from Worcester, England
18th-century English painters
English male painters
19th-century English painters
Edward Francis
19th-century English male artists
18th-century English male artists